The Arkavati is an important mountain river in Karnataka, India, originating at Nandi Hills of Chikkaballapura district. It is a tributary of the Kaveri, which it joins at 34 km south of Kanakapura,  Ramanagara District called Sangama in Kannada, after flowing through Ramanagara and Kanakapura. The river drains into the Chikkarayappanahalli Lake near Kanivenarayanapura. Kumudavathi and Vrishabhavathi rivers are tributaries to this river. It forms Chunchi falls near Haroshivanahalli. It joins Cauvery river as a tributary near Mekedatu.

Course
The river originates in the Nandi Hills in the Chikkaballapura district and flows through Ramanagara and Kanakapura before it eventually drains into the Chikkarayappanahalli Lake near Kanivenarayanapura. The Arkavati joins the Kaveri river around 34 km south of Kanakapura in the Ramanagara District. The river has three tributaries; Kumudavathi River, Suvarnamukhi River, and Vrishabhavathi River.

History 
The river has historically been used as a source of drinking water in Banglore and the surrounding regions.

Kingdom of Mysore Period
In 1891, when Bangalore had a population of just 180,000 people, the then dewan of Mysore, K. Seshadri Iyer realized the lack of a dedicated water source for the city and took up the construction of the Chamarajendra Waterworks at Hesaraghatta across the river. The reservoir was designed to supply water for up to 250,000 people. By 1918, the population of the city had already reached 250,000 and the reservoir was running dry. The Sir M Visvesvaraya committee recommended the construction of Tippagondanahalli reservoir which was commissioned in 1933. The first stage was designed to provide a daily supply of 27 million liters per day (MLD) of water for a population of 300,000. However, even this was not enough and, so, modifications were made to cater to the population of one million in 1956. Eventually, the Chamaraja Sagar reservoir was insufficient and the government had to turn to the Kaveri to fulfill the water needs of Bangalore.

Decline in 1980s 
It has been widely agreed upon that the destruction of the Arkavathi came about in the 1980s. This was a time when Bengaluru was urbanizing rapidly, which not only increased the demand for drinking water but also created scarcity for manual labor in the peripheral areas. As a result, the cost of labor went up. Added to this, the demand for firewood went up and as part of social forestry, the forest department distributed free eucalyptus seedlings to farmers. Eucalyptus is a water-intensive tree that uses up a large quantity of groundwater. This, in turn, reduced the groundwater levels in the catchment areas of the river and severely affected the water flow.

Efforts at Rejuvenation 
In 2005, the Arkavathy-Kumudvati River Rejuvenation Committee was formed to rejuvenate the river. But there were no further steps taken except forming the committee. The Bangalore Water Supply and Sewerage Board (BWSSB) attempted to purify the river through aerator systems to increase dissolved oxygen and a series of plants that remove pollutants and also to reduce the inflow of sewage into T.G. Halli.

See also 
 Ponnaiyar River
 Palar River
 Vrishabhavathi River
 Hesaraghatta Lake
 Thippagondanahalli Reservoir

References

Tributaries of the Kaveri River